Caldhame is a village in Angus, Scotland. It lies approximately 1 mile to the south of Forfar.

References

Villages in Angus, Scotland